Elizabeth Blackbourn is a former female international table tennis player from England.

Table tennis career
She was a member of the winning team in the 1947 World Table Tennis Championships. In addition she won a silver medal in the singles. She also won an English Open title.

Personal life
In 1948 she lived in South Africa and later won their National Championships.

See also
 List of England players at the World Team Table Tennis Championships
 List of table tennis players
 List of World Table Tennis Championships medalists

References

 http://www.ittf.com/ittf_stats/All_events3.asp?ID=763

Year of birth missing
English female table tennis players